Piotr (Peter) Pakhomkin (born 1985) is a Russian-American   classical guitarist who has performed at Carnegie Hall and given performances and masterclasses throughout Europe, Central and Northern America.

Early life
Pakhomkin was born in Saint Petersburg Russia and moved to Maryland in the United States in 1991. His first classical guitar teacher was Paul Moeller who prepared him for university studies in classical guitar. Pakhomkin earned his master's degree from Johns Hopkins University Peabody Institute and studied directly under Manuel Barrueco for six years. Pakhomkin was featured in Aaron Shearer: A Life With the Guitar, a production of Michael Lawrence Films.

Career
Pakhomkin took home First Prize from the 2012 Mexican International Guitar Competition in Culiacan and top prizes from the Boston GuitarFest International Guitar Competition, the Great Lakes Guitar Competition, the Montreal International Guitar Competition, and the European International Guitar Competition, “Enrico Mercatali” in Italy.

In 2014, Pakhomkin became a Strathmore Artist-in-Residence. After completing his residency he returned and continues to serve as a faculty member, performer and mentor in the Strathmore Institute for Artistic Development.

Pakhomkin won the 2016 Respighi International Soloist Competition and made his Carnegie Hall debut with the Chamber Orchestra of New York's "Masterwork Series" in June 2018. 
Pakhomkin continues to perform concerts in Maryland and across the United States as well as around the world, teaches classical guitar in Georgetown Washington, D.C. and publishes guitar exercises.

Technique
Pakhomkin plays exclusively on a 2010 Ross Gutmeier Guitar. He also emphasizes slow practice techniques for endurance and meditation for visualization and focus.

References

1985 births
American classical guitarists
Living people
American male guitarists
21st-century American guitarists
21st-century American male musicians
Musicians from Saint Petersburg
Musicians from Maryland
Russian emigrants to the United States
21st-century classical musicians
Peabody Institute alumni